Prince Dmitry Ivanovich Shakhovskoy (1861, Tsarskoye Selo – 1939, Moscow) was a Russian liberal politician.

Life 
Active participant in zemstvo congresses, 1904–1905; one of the organizers of the Union of Liberation.

One of the founders of Beseda and permanent member of the Central Committee of the Constitutional Democratic Party. Member and secretary of the Cadet group in the First State Duma (Russian Empire).

In May–July 1917 he was Minister of Social Welfare in the Russian Provisional Government.

After the Bolshevik revolution he was active in Soviet cooperative institutions, 1930. He was arrested by the NKVD and executed on 15 April 1939.

References 
 V.I. Gurko. Features And Figures Of The Past. Government And Opinion In The Reign Of Nicholas II.

1861 births
1939 deaths
People from Pushkin, Saint Petersburg
People from Tsarskoselsky Uyezd
Russian Constitutional Democratic Party members
Ministers of the Russian Provisional Government
Members of the 1st State Duma of the Russian Empire
Saint Petersburg State University alumni
Russian people executed by the Soviet Union